Yvonne Anna Lucia Lindholm (born 23 January 1966) is a Swedish businesswoman and politician, serving as party secretary of Alternative for Sweden since 28 November 2020.

Early life 

Yvonne Anna Lucia Lindholm was born on 23 January 1966 in Södermalm, Stockholm, Sweden.

Political career

Sweden Democrats 

She was previously politically active with the Sweden Democrats in Haninge Municipality.

Alternative for Sweden 

She ran on 9th place in the 2018 Swedish general election.

She was elected party secretary at the party conference in November 2020.

In June 2022, it was announced that Lindholm would run on 6th place in the 2022 Swedish general election.

Bulletin 
In November 2021, it was revealed that Lindholm had approved personal loans to the newly founded online newspaper Bulletin.

References 

1966 births
Living people
Conservatism in Sweden
Critics of Islamism
Critics of multiculturalism
21st-century Swedish politicians
Swedish politicians
Alternative for Sweden politicians
People from Haninge Municipality
Politicians from Stockholm
Swedish nationalists
Swedish people of Italian descent
Swedish businesspeople